Judith Mary Gough CMG (born 8 November 1972) is a British diplomat and the current Ambassador of the United Kingdom in Sweden.

Biography

Gough was educated at the University of Nottingham (BA German and Russian, 1995) and at King's College London (MA War in the Modern World, 2012). She then worked as a Consultant in emerging markets and financial services at Ernst and Young.

Gough joined the Foreign & Commonwealth Office (FCO) in 2001. Gough then served at the British embassy in South Korea. Starting from mid-September 2010 she was Ambassador of the United Kingdom to Republic of Georgia, and served as such till she was released of her post early 2013.

She then became FCO's Director for Eastern Europe and Central Asia.

In September 2015 Gough was appointed Ambassador of the United Kingdom in Ukraine.

In June 2019 Gough was appointed Ambassador of the United Kingdom in Sweden. She took up her appointment in August.

Gough is openly lesbian and raises two children with her partner, Julia Kleiousi.

References

1972 births
Living people
Alumni of the University of Nottingham
Alumni of King's College London
Ambassadors of the United Kingdom to Georgia (country)
Ambassadors of the United Kingdom to Sweden
Ambassadors of the United Kingdom to Ukraine
British women ambassadors
British lesbians
Lesbian diplomats
Companions of the Order of St Michael and St George